Vaudreuil—Soulanges is a federal electoral district in Quebec, Canada, that has been represented in the House of Commons of Canada from 1914 to 1968 and since 1997.

It consists of the Vaudreuil-Soulanges Regional County Municipality. The neighbouring ridings are Argenteuil—La Petite-Nation, Lac-Saint-Louis, Salaberry—Suroît, Stormont—Dundas—South Glengarry, and Glengarry—Prescott—Russell.

Profile
In recent electoral history, the Liberals have been dominant after taking the riding from the NDP in 2015. Their strength comes particularly from Vaudreuil, Dorion and Ile Perrot. The Bloc has its best showings in the south of the constituency, in Les Cèdres, with pockets in Vaudreuil and Rigaud. The Conservatives have also historically done relatively well, with notable showings in 2006 and 2008 (when they came second to the Bloc).

Demographics
According to the 2016 Census, 58% had French as their mother tongue, 26% spoke English as their mother tongue, 2% combined the two and 14% spoke another language.

History
The original Vaudreuil—Soulanges was created in 1914 when the ridings of Vaudreuil and Soulanges were combined into one riding.  In keeping with the usual Canadian naming practices, the appellations 'Vaudreuil' and 'Soulanges' were linked by an em-dash as the two counties remained officially separate, and their combination was for electoral purposes only. It was abolished in 1966.

In 1997, the Vaudreuil riding was renamed "Vaudreuil-Soulanges", as it had been realigned to be perfectly coterminal to the Vaudreuil—Soulanges Regional County Municipality.

This riding lost territory to Salaberry—Suroît during the 2012 electoral redistribution and was renamed "Vaudreuil—Soulanges".

Members of Parliament

This riding has elected the following Members of Parliament:

Election results

Vaudreuil—Soulanges, 2015–present

Vaudreuil-Soulanges, 1997–2015

			
Note: Conservative vote is compared to the total of the Canadian Alliance vote and Progressive Conservative vote in 2000 election.
	

Note: Canadian Alliance vote is compared to the Reform vote in 1997 election.

Vaudreuil—Soulanges, 1917–1968

Note: Ralliement créditiste vote is compared to Social Credit vote in the 1963 election.
					

					

						

					

						
Note: "National Government" vote is compared to Conservative vote in 1935 election.
					

					

					

Note: Change in popular vote is calculated from popular vote in the 1921 general election.

Note: Liberal vote is compared to Opposition vote in 1917 general election.

See also
 List of Canadian federal electoral districts
 Past Canadian electoral districts

References

 Campaign expense data from Elections Canada
Riding history from the Library of Parliament:
Vaudreuil—Soulanges, Quebec (1914–1966)
Vaudreuil—Soulanges, Quebec (1997–2008)
2011 Results from Elections Canada

Notes

Quebec federal electoral districts
Vaudreuil-Dorion
Vaudreuil-Soulanges Regional County Municipality